Greenwich Township may refer to one of the following places in the United States:

 Greenwich Township, Cumberland County, New Jersey
 Greenwich Township, Gloucester County, New Jersey
 Greenwich Township, Warren County, New Jersey
 Greenwich Township, Huron County, Ohio
 Greenwich Township, Pennsylvania

Township name disambiguation pages